Astara may refer to:

Places in Iran
 Astara, Iran, a city in Gilan Province
 Astara County, in Gilan Province
 Astara (electoral district), in Gilan Province
 Astara, East Azerbaijan, a village

Places in Azerbaijan
 Astara (rayon)
 Astara, Azerbaijan, capital of Astara Rayon

Other uses
 Kristin Astara, an American wrestler